"Lemon" is a song by Irish rock band U2. It is the fourth track on their eighth album, Zooropa (1993), and was released as its second single in September 1993. Inspired by old video footage of lead vocalist Bono's late mother, the lyrics describe an attempt to preserve memory through film. More than any previous U2 song, "Lemon" showcases Bono's falsetto skills, aided by atmospheric vocals from the Edge and Brian Eno, and is among the band's longest songs.

The single and promo releases were complete with different dance remixes, as well as a shortened edit of the title track. The "Perfecto Mix" by Paul Oakenfold and Steve Osborne was used on the PopMart Tour, being played as the band walked out of their Spinal Tap-like rock prop, a 40-foot mirrorball lemon, onto the B-stage for an encore, and was later reworked into "Skin on Skin" by Oakenfold's band Grace.

Recording and composition
"Lemon" was written late during the Zooropa sessions between March–May 1993 during the band's break in the Zoo TV Tour. Guitarist the Edge said the song originated from something he "worked up with a drum machine and bass, very rhythmic." He explained that he found it difficult to compose a guitar part to the song until he utilized an "unusual gated guitar effect which worked with the rhythm."

Lead vocalist Bono wrote the lyrics with his late mother in mind. He explains that it was a "strange experience to receive, in the post, from a very distant relative, early Super 8 footage of my mother, aged 24, younger than me, playing a game of rounders in slow motion." The footage showed Bono's mother at a wedding as the maid of honour, wearing a lemon-coloured dress. The film footage inspired Bono to write lyrics about using film to recreate and preserve memory.

Live performances
The song was played live at 10 different Zoo TV Tour shows in Australia, New Zealand, and Japan, during the show's encore.  During each performance, Bono would perform the song dressed as Zoo TV character "MacPhisto," a former cabaret performer with devilish horns. Each performance was immediately followed by the band's "With or Without You". As with most of Zooropa’s material, "Lemon" has never been performed live by U2 since the close of the Zoo TV tour.

Critical reception
Stephen Thomas Erlewine from AllMusic called the song a wonderful moment from the album, describing it as "space-age German disco". Larry Flick from Billboard wrote, "Jittery, danceable moment from the yummy Zooropa collection is yet another step away from standard U2 fare. This time, Bono dabbles in sunny pop/soul, wrapping a luscious falsetto around an infectious hook and funk-fortified rhythm base. In its original form, track will be a joy for top 40 programmers. Inspired remixes by Robbie Adams and David Morales will open doors at crossover radio and in clubs." Troy J. Augusto from Cashbox stated that here, the band "continues to push the envelope, adding yet another style twist to its catalog." He added, "Bouncy and quite danceable cut, which follows the desensitizing "Numb" single, starts with a funky groove and augments with powerful and fun vocals from Bono and one of the strongest hooks the band has unleashed in quite some time." Alan Jones from Music Week noted that it finds the singer "adopting a Jagger-like falsetto over a bouncy but sparse track that could lend itself to a dance remix." Parry Gettelman from Orlando Sentinel viewed it as a "fast number" and "strictly for the polite Eurodisco crowd."

Music video
The accompanying music video for "Lemon", directed by Mark Neale, was filmed in black and white with a grid-like background as a tribute to Eadweard Muybridge.  Muybridge was a photographer who was the first person to successfully capture fast motion on film, using his device, coincidentally named the Zoopraxiscope, a reference to the lyrics ("A man makes a picture – a moving picture/Through light projected he can see himself up close"). The video primarily features a sequence of clips of the band members playing their instruments and performing a series of distinct actions, with captions for each one (e.g. "man walking up incline", "man running", "man playing pool"). In the background of the video, a pendulum can be seen swinging, a clock can be seen ticking, as well as dollars falling from the sky, various scientific objects (DNA, satellite feeds, etc.), and a cross. All of these symbols seem to be representing man's attempt to preserve time, via money ("He turns his money into light to look for her"), religion, or technology. The video also featured Bono dressed as both "The Fly" and "MacPhisto".

Track listings
 UK 12"
 "Lemon" (Bad Yard Club Mix) – 8:47
 "Lemon" (Momo Beats) – 4:34
 "Lemon" (Version Dub) – 6:46
 "Lemon" (Serious Def Dub) – 6:42

 CD single
 "Lemon" (Edit) – 4:42
 "Lemon" (Oakenfold Jeep Mix) – 5:32
 "Lemon" (Album Version) – 6:58
 "Lemon" (Morales BYC Version Dub) – 6:36

Remixes

David Morales Mixes
 "Lemon" (Bad Yard Club Mix) – 10:16 / 8:47*
 "Lemon" (Bad Yard Club Edit) – 5:20
 "Lemon" (Version Dub) – 6:46*
 "Lemon" (Serious Def Dub) – 6:42
 "Lemon" (Momo's Reprise) – 4:08
 "Lemon" (Momo Beats) – 4:34 
Paul Oakenfold & Steve Osborne Mixes
 "Lemon" (Perfecto Mix) – 8:57
 "Lemon" (Trance Mix) – 8:57
 "Lemon" (Jeep Mix) – 5:30
Flood & Robbie Adams Mixes
 "Lemon" (Lemonade Mix) – 6:40
 "Lemon" (Lemonade Mix Edit)  – 4:15

Note: The "Bad Yard Club Mix" has differing durations depending on the release. The original version is well over 10 minutes long, and an edited version that fades out around the 8 minute mark exists on some releases. Also, the "Version Dub" remix is titled differently on certain releases, such as "BYC Version Dub" or "Morales BYC Version Dub", but these are all the same.

Charts and certifications

Weekly charts

Year-end charts

Certifications

References
Footnotes

Bibliography
 

1993 singles
U2 songs
Number-one singles in Iceland
Island Records singles
Song recordings produced by Brian Eno
Songs written by Bono
Songs written by the Edge
Songs written by Adam Clayton
Songs written by Larry Mullen Jr.
Song recordings produced by Flood (producer)
1993 songs
Disco songs